Cottage Lake is a census-designated place (CDP) in King County, Washington, United States. The population was 22,494 at the 2010 census. The lake itself falls within the 98072 ZIP code, while the developments east of the lake fall under the 98077 ZIP code.

Based on per capita income, Cottage Lake ranks 13th of 522 areas in the state of Washington to be ranked. Coldwell Banker ranked Cottage Lake #1 in 2013 for the fastest growing suburb in America.

Geography
Cottage Lake is located in northern King County at  (47.744892, -122.082675). It is bordered on the east by West Snoqualmie Valley Road, to the south by the Union Hill-Novelty Hill CDP, to the west by State Route 202 and the city of Woodinville, and to the north by the CDPs of Maltby and High Bridge in Snohomish County.

Most of the CDP drains south and west to the Sammamish River, while the eastern edge drains to the Snoqualmie River.

Demographics
At the 2000 census there were 24,330 people in 7,772 households, including 6,800 families, in the CDP. The population density was 1,066.5 people per square mile (411.8/km²). There were 7,916 housing units at an average density of 347.0/sq mi (134.0/km²).  The racial makeup of the CDP was 92.27% White, 0.34% Native American, 3.77% Asian, 0.18% Pacific Islander, 1.35% from other races, and 2.65% from two or more races. Hispanic or Latino of any race were 2.96%.

Of the 7,772 households 51.8% had children under the age of 18 living with them, 79.7% were married couples living together, 5.2% had a female householder with no husband present, and 12.5% were non-families. 9.3% of households were one person and 1.7% were one person aged 65 or older. The average household size was 3.13 and the average family size was 3.34 which far exceeds the U.S. average of 1.9.

The age distribution was 33.0% under the age of 18, 5.4% from 18 to 24, 28.3% from 25 to 44, 28.9% from 45 to 64, and 4.5% 65 or older. The median age was 37 years. For every 100 females there were 101.3 males. For every 100 females age 18 and over, there were 101.5 males.

According to a 2007 estimate, the median household income was $131,565, and the median family income  was $136,568. Males had a median income of $71,276 versus $40,935 for females. The per capita income for the CDP was $39,763. About 2.1% of families and 2.7% of the population were below the poverty line, including 3.5% of those under age 18 and 3.3% of those age 65 or over.

Education
Most of Cottage Lake is in the Northshore School District. Other portions are in the Lake Washington School District and the Riverview School District.

References

Census-designated places in King County, Washington